Big Cypress National Preserve is a United States National Preserve located in South Florida, about 45 miles (72 kilometers) west of Miami on the Atlantic coastal plain. The  Big Cypress, along with Big Thicket National Preserve in Texas, became the first national preserves in the United States National Park System when they were established on October 11, 1974. In 2008, Florida film producer Elam Stoltzfus featured the preserve in a PBS documentary.

Big Cypress borders the wet freshwater marl prairies of Everglades National Park to the south, and other state and federally protected cypress country in the west, with water from the Big Cypress flowing south and west into the coastal Ten Thousand Islands region of Everglades National Park.

History
Archaeology at Platt Island in the preserve shows humans settled there more than two thousand years ago. The Calusa people had an extensive presence in the area when Europeans arrived. Big Cypress was historically occupied by various cultures of Native Americans; the last were the Seminole of the nineteenth century. Their descendants include the federally recognized Miccosukee Tribe of Indians of Florida and the Seminole Tribe of Florida.

Early European-American settlers hunted herons and egrets, whose feathers were popular with 19th and 20th century hat-makers in New York and Paris. Poachers hunted American alligators and American crocodiles to near extinction. When the timber industry began to operate in the area, it built railroads, and cut and hauled out most of the cypress ecosystem's old growth trees. Portions of the Big Cypress, which is slightly more elevated than the western Everglades, were farmed for winter vegetables.

The search for oil in Florida began in 1901 with no success. After almost 80 dry holes had been drilled throughout the state, on September 26, 1943, Humble Oil Company (later to become Exxon) discovered Florida's first producing oil well in the northwest portion of what is now Big Cypress National Preserve. When Everglades National Park was established in 1947, Big Cypress was originally intended to be included; however, because the land had not been purchased from its private owners, Big Cypress was ultimately released from the park system.

In the 1960s, the site was proposed to become the Miami Jetport, a massive new airport intended to replace Miami International Airport. Construction began in 1968, but due to efforts of Native Americans, hunters, and conservationists, construction was halted in 1970 after only one of the proposed six runways was completed. They followed up with a campaign to have Big Cypress included in the National Park System. The single completed runway is now known as the Dade-Collier Training and Transition Airport.

Big Cypress National Preserve differs from Everglades National Park in that, when it was established by law in 1974, the Miccosukee, Seminole and Traditional people were provided with permanent rights to occupy and use the land in traditional ways; in addition, they have first rights to develop income-producing businesses related to the resources and use of the preserve, such as guided tours. They and other hunters may use off-road vehicles, and home and business owners have been permitted to keep their properties in the preserve. As in Everglades National Park, petroleum exploration was permitted within Big Cypress in the authorizing legislation, but plans are under way for the government to buy out the remaining petroleum leases in order to shut down non-governmental commercial access to the environment.

Climate
Big Cypress has a tropical monsoon climate (Am according to Köppen climate classification), bordering on tropical savanna climate (Aw). Days are some of the hottest in Florida. However, nights cool down into the 50s °F (low 10s °C) in winter. Highs exceed  on 154 days per year, while they fall below  on just 8 days.

Flora and fauna

The preserve is highly diverse biologically. It is dominated by a wet cypress forest, but while "few giant cypress remain...one third of the swamp is covered with dwarf pond cypress." It is host to an array of flora and fauna, including mangroves, orchids, alligators, crocodiles, venomous snakes like the cottonmouth and eastern diamondback rattlesnake, a variety of birds, river otter, deer, bobcat, coyote, black bear and cougar.

The preserve is also home to federally listed endangered species including the eastern indigo snake and the Florida sandhill crane.

Tourism

Twelve campgrounds in Big Cypress are tailored to motor vehicles, where tourists planning overnight stays can park their vehicles and off-road vehicles in designated areas. The southern terminus of the Florida National Scenic Trail is located in Big Cypress, and provides hiking opportunities during the winter months.  Hiking throughout Big Cypress is enjoyable in all seasons, with most of the cypress country more hospitable to hikers than the dense sawgrass prairies of the central Everglades.  Some of the most beautiful wading and walking can be found in cypress strands and prairies between the Loop Road and the Tamiami Trail.

Wildlife is abundant in the preserve. Most notable and regularly seen, the American alligators can be up to around 12 feet in length. Another notable and endangered animal, the Florida panther calls the Preserve home. Though both generally relatively timid, wading through the cypress country requires constant alertness. Before going out, visit one of the preserve's visitor centers for information on the current conditions and local trails. The visitor centers offer an educational video about the surroundings, also viewable on the Big Cypress YouTube channel. Rangers often lead swamp walk hikes in the dry winter months, as well as canoe trips, and boardwalk talks.

Hunting is a long-established recreational activity in the area and is protected in the designation of the area as a Preserve. Hunters were instrumental in protecting this corner of remote, wild Florida. Hunting activities continue today and include seasons for archery, muzzle loading and general gun. Typical game species are white-tailed deer, turkey and hogs. Alligator hunting is not allowed within the national preserve. Hunting within the preserve is managed cooperatively between the National Park Service and the Florida Fish and Wildlife Conservation Commission.

Controversy over off-road vehicles

Touted as a "recreational paradise" by the Department of the Interior, Big Cypress was created in part to accommodate access with off-road vehicles (ORVs) by the hunters and the Miccosukee and Seminole people who had worked to protect Big Cypress from drainage and development. However, scientists and conservationists have noted an increase in ORV recreation that prompted the National Park Service in 2001 to proactively manage ORV recreation and to reduce  of primary trails within the preserve, despite persistent calls for more from hunters and ORV enthusiasts.

According to a 2001 study conducted by the United States Geological Survey,
ORV use in Big Cypress National Preserve has impacted wildlife populations and habitats through modifications to water flow patterns (direction and velocity) and water quality, soil displacement and compaction, direct vegetation damage, disturbance to foraging individuals, and, ultimately, overall suitability of habitats for wildlife.

Given these conclusions, environmental groups opposed the announcement by park officials in 2006 of a new study to determine whether the recreational benefit of more trails is worth the risk of additional damage to the ecosystem.

Gallery

References

External links

National Park Service: Big Cypress National Preserve
Map of Big Cypress National Preserve

 
Parks in Florida
National Park Service areas in Florida
Swamps of Florida
Protected areas of Collier County, Florida
Protected areas of Monroe County, Florida
Protected areas of Miami-Dade County, Florida
Landforms of Collier County, Florida
Landforms of Monroe County, Florida
Landforms of Miami-Dade County, Florida
1974 establishments in Florida
Protected areas established in 1974